Geoffrey is an English and French masculine given name. It is generally considered the Anglo-Norman form of the Germanic compound  'god' and  'peace'. It is a derivative of Dutch Godfried, German Gottfried and Old English Gotfrith and Godfrith.

Alexander MacBain considered it as being found in the Gaelic and Welsh forms; potentially before or contemporary to the Anglo-Saxon, with the examples of Goraidh, Middle Gaelic Gofraig (1467 MS.), Godfrey (do.), Irish Gofraidh (F.M.), Middle Irish Gothfrith, Gofraig (Tigernach, 989), Early Irish Gothfraid (Lib. Lein.), E. Welsh Gothrit (Ann. Camb.). Macbain suggested these Celtic forms of the name were closer related to the Anglo-Saxon Godefrid than the Norse Goðröðr, Gudrød or Góröðr; however he does not elaborate further on the origin or relation.

The form as 'Geoffrey' was probably introduced to Norman England.

It was also Anglicised as Jeffrey later after the name became more popular after the likes of President Jefferson. Popularity of the name declined after the medieval period, but it was revived in modern England and the British Empire at large. Modern hypocorisms include  Geoff or Jeff.

Jeffrey and its variants are found as surnames, usually ending in -s (e.g. Jefferies, Jaffrays); The surname Jefferson is also a patronymic version of the given name.

Etymology 
The Old French form of the name was Geoffrei ([dʒɔfrej]), which developed into West Middle French Geoffrey and East Middle French Geoffroy.

Latinised forms include Jotfredus, Jozsfredus, Josfredus (10th century) and Jof[f]redus, Jofridus, Jaufredus, Geffredus (11th century).

The original spelling with Jo- was modified in Geo-. The graphic e after G is used in French to avoid the pronunciation [go], but [ʒɔ] instead.  The spelling Geo- is probably due to the influence of the first name Georges, derived from Old French Jorre, Joire.

The Old Frankish name Godefrid itself is from the Germanic elements god- and frid-. The Middle Latin form is Godefridus (whence also Godfrey).  The second element is widely used in Germanic names, and has a meaning of "peace, protection". The first element god- is conflated from two, or possibly three, distinct roots, ie got and possibly *gaut, in origin a tribal name (Geats, Goths) or a theonym (a  byname of Wotan).

Albert Dauzat (1951, rev. ed. 1980) followed by others, argued that the Middle French name Geoffrey in fact retains a distinction between two Germanic names which became conflated in the Middle Ages. According to this argument, Godfrey continues *goda-friþu-, while Geoffroy continues *gaut-friþu-. If a strictly phonetic development is assumed, Geoffrey cannot be derived from Godfrid, as *go- would result in Old French go- ([gɔ]) and not geo- (jo-, [dʒɔ]), ie goda-fridu would yield Godefroy [godfrwa] but not Geoffroy.
On the other hand, *gau-  [gaw] would regularly result in  jo- (geo- [dʒɔ]), i.e *gaut-fridu- would regularly result in Geoffroy [dʒɔf:rwa].

Alternative suggestions which would derive the first element from Germanic  gisal- 'hostage',  or w(e)alah 'Gallo-Roman; stranger' are also rejected by Dauzat as phonetically impossible: gi would have resulted in Old French [dʒi] (Modern French [ʒi]), as in Gisalbert > Gilbert (ie *Gisalfrid > *Giffrey), and  *w(e)alh- would have resulted in *gaul- [gol] (ie *Wealhfrid > *Gaulfrey, *Gauffrey).

List of people called Geoffrey

In television and film 
 Geoff Dolan, New Zealand actor, singer and corporate entertainer
 Geoff Edwards, American actor and game-show host
 Geoff Eigenmann, Filipino actor, host and model 
 Geoff Harvey, Australian musician and television personality
 Geoffrey Hayes, English television presenter and actor
 Geoffrey Holder, Trinidadian-American actor
 Geoffrey Lewis, American actor 
 Geoff Morrell, Australian actor
 Geoff Murphy, New Zealand film director, writer and assistant director
 Geoffrey Palmer, English actor
 Geoffrey Perkins, British radio and television producer
 Geoff Peterson, robotic sidekick on The Late Late Show with Craig Ferguson
 Geoffrey Rush, Australian actor
 Geoff Thompson, British writer, film director and self-defence expert
 Geoffrey Wright, Australian film director

In sports 

 Geoff Abrams, American tennis player
 Geoffrey Edward Beck (1918–2019), English cricketer and minister
 Geoff Bent, one of the eight Manchester United players that lost their lives in the Munich air disaster
 Geoff Blum, infielder in Major League Baseball
 Geoff Bodine, NASCAR driver
 Geoff Boss, ChampCar and IMSA driver
 Geoffrey Boycott, former England cricketer
 Geoff Capes, former British shot put champion and two-time World's Strongest Man winner
 Geoffrey Cheah, Hong Kong competitive swimmer
 Geoff Collins, Head Football (American) Coach at Georgia Tech
 Geoffrey Gray (born 1997), American-Israeli professional basketball player in the Israeli Basketball Premier League
 Geoff Grover, Australian Rules Footballer with St Kilda and Port Melbourne
 Geoff Horsfield, English football player
 Geoff Howarth, New Zealand cricketer
 Geoff Hudson, English footballer
 Geoff Hunt, Australian squash player, ranked the World No.1 squash player from 1975 to 1980
 Geoff Hurst, the only footballer to score a hat-trick in a World Cup final
 Geoff Jenkins, outfielder in Major League Baseball
 Geoff Ogilvy, Australian golfer, winner of the 2006 US Open
 Geoff Roes, ultra-runner, Western States 100 Endurance Run record holder
 Geoff Rowley, professional skateboarder
 Geoff Sanderson, forward in the National Hockey League
 Geoff Schwartz, American NFL football player (Carolina Panthers)
 Geoff Toovey, Rugby League Coach for the Manly-Warringah Sea Eagles

In literature 
 Geoffrey Chaucer, English author, poet, philosopher, bureaucrat, and diplomat
 Geoffrey Household (1900–1988), British writer
 Geoff Johns, American writer of comic books
 Geoffrey Moorhouse (1931–2009), British writer

In music 
 Geoff Barrow, producer/instrumentalist for the band, Portishead
 Geoffrey Arnold Beck, is an English rock guitarist who played with The Yardbirds
 Geoff Berner, Canadian singer-songwriter on the accordion
 Geoffrey Burgon, English composer
 Geoff Castellucci, bass vocalist for the Orlando, Florida-based a cappella group, VoicePlay
 Geoff Downes, keyboard player known for his work with The Buggles, Yes and Asia
 Geoff Emerick, recording studio audio engineer, who is best known for his work with the Beatles
 Geoffrey Gordon, American composer
 Geoffrey Kelly, multi-instrumentalist and vocalist for Canadian celtic folk rock band Spirit of the West
 Geoff Nicholls, former keyboard player for Black Sabbath
 Geoff Richardson, multi-instrumentalist for Caravan
 Geoff Rickly, lead singer and lyricist of the Post-Hardcore band Thursday
 Geoff Stone, percussionist for Drastic Fall
 Geoff Tate, American rock singer, former member of the band Queensryche
 Geoff Wigington, guitarist for pop punk band Waterparks

In politics 
 Geoffrey Clifton-Brown, British Conservative Party politician
 Geoffrey Cox, British Conservative politician
 Geoff Diehl, Former Massachusetts State Representative
 Geoffrey Dickens, British Conservative politician
 Geoffrey Howe, British Conservative politician and former Deputy Prime Minister

In history 

 Geoffrey, Duke of Brittany, son of King Henry II of England and brother of King Richard and King John
 Geoffrey (archbishop of York), illegitimate son of King Henry II of England, Bishop of Lincoln and Archbishop of York
 Geoffrey (Dean of Lincoln), 12th-century English Roman Catholic priest
 Geoffrey of Monmouth, Welsh cleric and chronicler
 Geoffrey Norman Blainey, Australian historian and political commentator
 Gioffre Borgia, Prince of Squillace, illegitimate son of Pope Alexander VI and brother of Lucrezia Borgia, Cesare Borgia and Giovanni Borgia
 Geoffrey Rudolph Elton, British historian of the Tudor period
 Geoffrey Plantagenet, Count of Anjou, Duke of Normandy, founder of the House of Plantagenet

In other fields 
 Geoffrey Beene (1927–2004), American fashion designer, born Samuel Albert Bozeman, Jr
 Geoff Dixon, Australian corporate executive 
 Geoffrey Evans (1940-2012) English-born Irish serial killer
 Geoffrey C. Hazard Jr., American law professor
 Geoffrey Heald Canadian born Registered Massage Therapist
 Geoffrey Hinton, British computer scientist
 Geoffrey Langlands (1917–2019), British Army officer and educator
 Geoffroy Lejeune (born 1988), French journalist
 Geoff Lloyd, British radio DJ
 Geoffrey Ma, Chief Justice of Hong Kong
 Geoffrey Massey (1924–2020), Canadian architect and urban planner
 Geoff Morrell, American journalist and public affairs official
 Geoffrey Pleyers, Belgian sociologist and researcher 
 Geoff Ramsey, American voice actor and film producer
 Geoffrey Russom, American philologist
 Geoffrey See, entrepreneur and startup ecosystem builder in North Korea

See also 
 Galfrid
 Gofraid
 Godfrey
 Gottfried, Godefroy, Goffredo
 Jeffrey
 Jeffries, Jeffers

References

English masculine given names
French masculine given names
Lists of people by given name

de:Geoffrey
eo:Geoffrey
fr:Geoffroy
ja:ジェフ